Ambunti is a town in Ambunti-Dreikikier District of East Sepik Province in Papua New Guinea. It has a population of 2,110.

The town serves as a gateway to April Salome Forest Management Area.

The patrol base at Ambunti featured in the 1971 documentary A Blank on the Map.

See also
Ambunti Rural LLG

References 

Populated places in East Sepik Province